Pratylenchus fallax is a plant pathogenic nematode .

References 

fallax
Nematodes described in 1968
Plant pathogenic nematodes
Invertebrates of Europe